Tantangara is a locality in the Snowy Monaro Regional Council region of New South Wales, Australia. It is the location of the Tantangara Dam on the Murrumbidgee River, part of the Snowy Mountains Scheme.

Today, the entire locality is contained in the Kosciuszko National Park. The Port Phillip Trail and Dam Trail pass through Tantangara.

Heritage listings
Tantangara has a number of heritage-listed sites, including:
 Currango Homestead

References

Localities in New South Wales
Snowy Monaro Regional Council